Nigerian English, also known as Nigerian Standard English, is a dialect of English spoken in Nigeria. Based on British English, the dialect contains various loanwords and collocations from the native languages of Nigeria, due to the need to express concepts specific to the culture of the nation (e.g. senior wife).

Nigerian Pidgin, a pidgin derived from English, is mostly used in informal conversations, but the Nigerian Standard English is used in politics, formal education, the media, and other official uses.

Dialects 
There are three main dialects of Nigerian English: Hausa English (spoken by the Hausa), Igbo English (spoken by the Igbo) and Yoruba English (spoken by the Yoruba).

Sociocultural implications 
Nigerian English is a nativized form of English. Like South African English, its nativization and development as a New World English corresponds roughly with the period of colonization by Britain and afterward. Nigerian English became a nativized language that functions uniquely within its own cultural context.

Nigerian English has long been a controversial idea in that the idea of a "Standard Nigerian English" (SNE) is difficult to establish, considering the fossilization that has occurred in the formal instruction of English in many regions of Nigeria, for a variety of factors largely including "interference, lack of facilities, and crowded classrooms". Contact between British Standard English and Nigerian English, which have two very different sets of grammatical, pronunciation, and spelling rules has caused there to arise a predominant occurrence of "faulty analogy" (the assumption that because one grammatical feature resembles another in usage, the rules applying to the former also apply to the latter) in what Okoro refers to as "substandard" varieties of Nigerian English.

However, a few features have united across communities that bridge the differences between different varieties even within Nigerian English, all pertaining to cultural values that are expressed uniquely in English terms. Two prevalent examples are "sorry" and "sir". The literal meaning of "sorry" usually indicates some sort of responsibility on the part of the person saying it, but for all varieties of Nigerian English, it is used to express sympathy in a unique way, or to show empathy to whoever has experienced misfortune. "Sir" or the replacement of names with titles indicates respect and a high value for politeness. The tacking on of "sir" to another title ("Professor sir") illustrates a greater level of prestige than normal or an instance of being more polite than the norm.

Though the exact levels of Nigerian English usage are contested, one suggestion indicates there are four levels of usage within the nativized (but not indigenous) English:

Level 1: Pidgin, spoken as the casual language
Level 2: A step above, and the most spoken. Spoken by those with elementary education
Level 3: Marked by more expansive lexicon, fluency and use of the features that Level 1 speakers "avoid" spoken by those with "secondary education"
Level 4: Proposed as the NSE as its features are very similar (but still characteristically Nigerian) "to Standard English", spoken by those with a college education

The system of levels is only one of the proposed differentiations of the pragmatic realizations of Nigerian English. Because of the nature of its presence in Nigeria, the English language has been a point of contention among Nigerian residents who strive for a more nativisitic lifestyle (returning to the predominant speech of indigenous languages of the country). However, the nature of the introduction and the role of English in exerting the values of colonization on a post-colonial Nigeria have caused some to call English inseparable from the nature of language in the region.

Lexico-semantic innovations 
There are three basic subsets of innovations that have occurred as a result of the nativization of English in Nigeria: "loanwords, coinages, and semantic shifts".

Loanwords
A loanword is defined by the Oxford Dictionary as "a word adopted from a foreign language with little or no modification". Nigerian English has a plethora of loanwords that have no direct English equivalents but have rooted themselves into the dialect with a unique meaning. The examples below of prominent Nigerian English loanwords are provided by Grace Ebunlola (quoting them):

 agbada: a kind of flowing dress for men, especially among the Yoruba: ‘Chief Ogini wore agbada to the wedding ceremony.’
 babban riga: a kind of long, loose dress for men, especially among the Hausas: ‘I really like your babban riga.’
 akara: an item of food, also referred to as ‘bean cake’
 akamu pap: a kind of corn porridge: ‘This morning I ate akara and akamu.’
 akpu, banga, eba, egusi, ogbono, tuwo: ‘soup’ (in various Nigerian languages), as in: ‘Anytime I eat eba I have stomach upset’; ‘Can I eat some tuwo?’; ‘I don’t like the smell of akpu’; ‘I will like to eat ogbono soup mixed with egusi.’
 danfo, okada: a mode of transportation: ‘You either go by danfo or you take an okada.’
 adakaji, oba: chieftaincy titles, as in: ‘The Adakaji II was at the coronation of the oba of Lagos.’

Coinages 

Coinages, though similar to loanwords, function as a sort of colloquialism that is spoken in English but has a unique cultural meaning. These are also especially prolific in Nigerian English. Compared to loanwords, coinages typically have a short lifespan and are adopted for unique cultural purposes of the present, and as such, die out quickly after their acquisition.

Examples are provided by Abdullahi-Idiagbon and Olaniyi:

 Long-leg (meaning "well-connected")
 Free and fair
 Come of age
 Carpet crossing (equivalent to crossing the floor in the UK)
 No-go area
 Man of timber and calibre
 Money-bag
 Political juggernaut/Heavyweight
 Political bride (a coalition partner or running mate)
 Accord Concordia 
 Bottom power (woman using her sexuality as a bargaining chip)

Coinages are not the same as acronyms, though Nigerian English also has unique acronyms.

Acronyms serve a variety of functions, and follow the same rules as Standard English acronyms: the first letters are taken from each word in a phrase (especially titles of office, agencies of the government, etc.).

Semantic shifts 
The study of semantics is, overall, a general study of the meaning of words.

A common example of semantic shift is in the reappropriation of the meaning of English words for Nigerian purposes and uses. This can cause the original English meanings to be "shifted, restricted, or extended".

For example, in some areas, despite the international meaning of "trek" having a connotation of a long distance or difficult journey, the Nigerian use is means "walk a short distance".

A particularly expansive example of semantics in NE is the use of a variety of greetings. That stretching of meaning can change the meaning of the English phrase but also represents something from Nigerian culture. For example, the saying "goodnight, ma" can be said regardless of time of day and functions simply as an assumption that the person in question will not be seen until the next day. That has especially been noticed in Yoruba culture.

Phonology 

As the literature currently stands, most phonological studies have analyzed a plethora of Nigerian English speakers from a wide range of backgrounds (region of origin, current profession, social class, etc.). There has been special focus on such regions as Hausa, Igbo, and Yoruba. Nigerian English can be thought of in a similar way to American English in this approach: just as in American English, Nigerian English varies from region to region, and as such, phonological variables are realized in different ways in different regions.

Some common features across Nigerian Englishes include:

 Voiced -z sounds in which the "s" is present in spelling become voiceless, i.e. "boys" is pronounced .
 Fronting of /ɪ/ vowels into /e/, exhibited in words such as "expect", pronounced /ekˈspekt/ in NE.
 Because voiced palato-alveolar fricative /ʒ/ is not present in most Nigerian varieties, any words including this phoneme are converted into the -sh /ʃ/ sound, such as in the word "conclusion", pronounced  in NE.

Prosody 

Early studies have associated Nigerian English with being syllable-timed rather than stress-timed, but the dialect has thus far evaded specific grouping in either category. Milde and Jan-Torsten suggest that Nigerian English is closer to a tonal language, akin to other West African tonal languages, but rather than tones being associated with stressed and unstressed syllables, they are associated with grammatical functions. They suggest that "articles, prepositions and conjunctions tend to have a low tone, whereas nouns, verbs and adjectives are usually produced with a high tone."

Use in technology 
In July 2019, Google announced its new Nigerian English accented voice for Maps, Google Assistant, and other Google products. It is based on work of speech synthesis created by a team at Google led by Nigerian linguist Kola Tubosun. In January 2020, Oxford English Dictionary added over two dozen new words of Nigerian English to the Oxford Dictionary.

See also

References

Further reading 

Farooq Kperogi: Glocal English: The Changing Face and Form of Nigerian English in Global World. New York: Peter Lang, 2015. 

 
Languages of Nigeria
Dialects of English